Kunga cake or kungu is a type of dish found in the African Great Lakes region, specifically countries surrounding Lake Malawi (Tanzania, Malawi and Mozambique), made of millions of densely compressed midges or flies. 

American entomologist May Berenbaum discusses the situation where large swarms of midges can cause significant problems for local populations. She cites an example of how Chaoborus edulis swarms form near Lake Malawi and how the local people turn them into kunga cakes as a "rich source of protein" which is eaten "with great enthusiasm". In his book on edible insects and human entomophagy, Insects: An Edible Field Guide, Stefan Gates suggest that people can ”make burgers with it, or dry it out and grate parts of it off into stews" for "umami richness". Bear Grylls calls it "a great survival food" and describes how vast quantities are caught and turned into kunga cake. Explorer David Livingstone (1865) claimed that they "tasted not unlike caviare" though Professor of Tropical Entomology Arnold van Huis declared that he did not like it at all.

To catch the flies a frying pan can be coated in cooking oil and then wafted through a swarm.

References

African cuisine
Insects as food
Diptera of Africa